Francis William Ogilvy-Grant, 6th Earl of Seafield (6 March 1778 – 30 July 1853) was a Scottish nobleman, a Member of Parliament and is listed as the 25th Chief of The Clan Grant.

The names Grant and Ogilvie

The family of Grant of Grant, on succeeding in 1811 to the Earldom of Seafield, first adopted the surname of 
Grant-Ogilvie, otherwise Grant-Ogilvy. This order was later reversed, so that Lord Cassillis' history, 'The Rulers of Strathspey' (1911) names the 5th, 6th, 7th and 8th Earls as Grant-Ogilvie but all their successors from Sir James, 9th Earl, as Ogilvie-Grant. Sir William Fraser's 'The Chiefs of Grant' (1884) preferred the style of Grant of Grant and Lord Ogilvie of Deskford and Cullen for both the 5th and 6th Earls; his article on the 7th Earl is named Sir John Charles Grant Ogilvie but the accompanying portrait is named Sir John Charles Ogilvie Grant, Baronet, Seventh Earl of Seafield etc. For the sake of consistency, historical works and articles (including this series) often retrospectively reassign the spelling and order of these family names.

In 2017 The family name of the Earl of Seafield is Ogilvie-Grant according to the Seafield Estates.

Genealogy

Born 6 March 1778, the Hon. Francis William Grant was the fourth son of Sir James Grant, 8th Baronet, and Jane Duff.  In 1811 he married Mary Anne Dunn, daughter of John Dunn, and they had five children. After his first wife's death (1840), he married Louisa Emma, daughter of Robert George Maunsell, in 1843. Owing to the mental incapacity of his brother Sir Lewis Alexander Grant (and the earlier deaths of two older brothers) from 1811 he acted as Curator of the Grant Estates and those of the Seafield Earldom until he succeeded as Earl of Seafield in his own right in 1840. Lord Seafield died in July 1853, aged 75, and was buried at the mausoleum at Duthil Old Parish Church and Churchyard, just outside the village of Duthil, Inverness-shire. He was succeeded in his titles by his third son from his first marriage, John Charles Ogilvy-Grant.

Public service

Being a younger son, he began a military career when aged 15 in 1793 as a lieutenant in the Strathspey Fencibles. After time in other regiments, he was commissioned a lieutenant colonel in the Third Argyllshire Fencibles in 1799 and served with them as part of the Gibraltar garrison in 1800 and 1801. He received a commission as a full colonel in the British Army in 1809 on appointment as Lord Lieutenant of Inverness-shire. Meanwhile, 'Colonel Grant', as he was known, entered Parliament and followed a political path.  

In 1802 'Colonel Grant' was elected to the House of Commons for Elgin Burghs, a seat he held until 1806, and then represented Inverness Burghs from 1806 to 1807, Elginshire from 1807 to 1832 and Elginshire and Nairnshire from 1832 to 1840. In 1840 he succeeded his elder brother as sixth Earl of Seafield, and sat in the House of Lords as a Scottish Representative Peer from 1841 until his death in 1853. He therefore attended Parliament for a period of 50 years, voting against the Reform Act of 1832 while sitting in the Commons. Sir William Fraser reported, "In politics his Lordship was a Conservative, and during his long public career loyally supported his party. He was a warm supporter of Sir Robert Peel."

A member of the Church of Scotland, Sir Francis William was an ordained elder sitting in the Presbytery of Abernethy, which he also for many years represented in the General Assembly.

As a proprietor

Lord Seafield was noted for tree-planting. Sir William Fraser wrote that:He was known as the largest planter of trees in Britain ... the annals of the Highland and Agricultural Society of Scotland recording that in 1847, that at that date 31,686,482 young trees, Scotch firs, larch, and hardwoods, had been planted under the Earl's direction over an area of 8223 acres.... For these plantations, which were effected in the districts of Cullen, Moray, Strathspey, and Glen Urquhart, the Highland Society awarded to the Earl their gold medal. Living mainly in Cullen House, his taste for ornamental landscape resulted in remodelling of the house, grounds and nearby town, as well as improvements to other towns within his estates.

In 1826, at Duthil, Lord Seafield instructed the rebuilding of the Parish Church and the erection of the Seafield Mausoleum.

In 1836 he gave access to his lands to representatives of the New Brunswick and Nova Scotia Land Company and expressed his opinion that some of the people of Urquhart might usefully emigrate.

References

External links 
 
Clan Grant: http://www.clangrant.org

Seafield Estate: http://www.seafield-estate.co.uk

Seafield, Francis Ogilvy-Grant, 6th Earl of
Seafield, Francis Ogilvy-Grant, 6th Earl of
Earls of Seafield
Seafield, Francis Ogilvy-Grant, 6th Earl of
Members of the Parliament of the United Kingdom for Scottish constituencies
Ogilvy-Grant, Francis
UK MPs 1802–1806
UK MPs 1806–1807
UK MPs 1807–1812
UK MPs 1812–1818
UK MPs 1818–1820
UK MPs 1820–1826
UK MPs 1826–1830
UK MPs 1830–1831
UK MPs 1831–1832
UK MPs 1832–1835
UK MPs 1835–1837
UK MPs 1837–1841
UK MPs who inherited peerages
Lord-Lieutenants of Inverness-shire
Grant, Francis Ogilvy-Grant, 5th Lord